New Horizons in Linguistics is a 1970 book edited by Sir John Lyons. It includes essays by D. B. Fry, John Laver, Erik Fudge, P. H. Matthews, MAK Halliday, Manfred Bierwisch, James Peter Thorne, Janet Dean Fodor, M. F. Bott, J. C. Marshall, Robin Campbell, Roger Wales, P. N. Johnson-Laird, Herbert H. Clark, John Bernard Pride and Paul Kiparsky.

Reception
The book was reviewed by C. E. Bazell and Norman Mundhenk.

References

External links
New Horizons in Linguistics
1970 non-fiction books
Penguin Books books
Edited volumes
Linguistics books